Tarare is a commune in eastern France. Tarare or Tarrare may also refer to

 Canton of Tarare in eastern France
 Tarare (opera) by Antonio Salieri
 Tarrare (c. 1772–1798), a French showman and soldier
 Tarrare (horse) (1823–1847), a British Thoroughbred racehorse

See also
 Tarrare
 Tarari (disambiguation)
 Tarar